This is a list of writers on popular music

Lorraine Ali 
Harry Allen
Hilton Als
Gina Arnold
E. Ruth Anderson
Michael Azerrad
Lester Bangs
J. Bennett
Vladimir Bogdanov
Jennifer Lopez
Wayne Baker Brooks
Bart Bull
Garry Bushell
Jeff Chang
John Chilton
Ian Christe
Robert Christgau
Donald Clarke
Ta-Nehisi Coates
Ray Coleman
J.D. Considine
Richard Cook
Karl Coryat
Charles R. Cross
Cameron Crowe
Tony Cummings
Stanley Dance
Lynnée Denise
Anthony DeCurtis
Charles Delaunay
Jim DeRogatis
Jaquira Díaz
Peter Doggett
Robert Duncan
Paul Du Noyer
Alice Echols
Chuck Eddy
Jenny Eliscu
Michael Erlewine
Stephen Thomas Erlewine
Kodwo Eshun
John Fahey
Anthony Fantano
Mick Farren
Leonard Feather
Wendy Fonarow
Ben Fong-Torres
Sasha Frere-Jones
David Fricke
Simon Frith
Donna Gaines
Paul Gambaccini
Peter Gammond
Nelson George
Charlie Gillett
Ira Gitler
Daniel Glass
Joe Glazer
Leslie Gourse
Gary Graff
Bill Graham
Edward Greenfield
George Grove
Peter Guralnick
dream hampton
John Harris
Will Hermes
Stephen Holden
Amelia Ishmael
Maura Johnston
Allan Jones
Mark Kemp
Nick Kent
Chuck Klosterman
Cub Koda
Greg Kot
Jon Landau
Peter Lang
Peter Laughner
Minna Lederman
Sarah Lewitinn
Alan Light
Greil Marcus
Dave Marsh
Tris McCall
Joel McIver
Legs McNeil
Richard Meltzer
John Mendelsohn
Sia Michel
Brett Milano
Scott Miller
Jeffrey Morgan
Paul Morley
Charles Shaar Murray
Noel Murray
Ed Naha
Paul Nelson
Lucy O'Brien
Rob O'Connor
Robert Palmer
John Peck (as "The Mad Peck")
Mark J. Petracca
Amanda Petrusich
Ann Powers
David Quantick
Nathan Rabin
Simon Reynolds
Tim Riley
Lisa Robinson
John Rockwell
Jody Rosen
Alex Ross
Kelefa Sanneh
Jon Savage
Ryan Schreiber
Jane Scott
Joel Selvin
Rob Sheffield
Sylvie Simmons
Patti Smith
Mat Snow
Bill Spooner 
Marc Spitz
Neil Strauss
Touré
Greg Tate
Jon Tiven
Nick Toczek
Nick Tosches
Touré
Everett True
Rob Tyner
Richie Unterberger
Penny Valentine
Clinton Walker
Ed Ward
Jeff Weiss
Chris Welch
Cliff White
Richard Williams
Ellen Willis
Carl Wilson
Bob Woffinden
Douglas Wolk
Frank Worrall
Veljko Despot
Hrvoje Horvat
Aleksandar Dragaš
Petar Janjatović
Igor Vidmar
Molly Meldrum

Music journalism
Criticism
Popular music